Samarda, also spelled Samardha, is a village in the Bhopal district of Madhya Pradesh, India. It is located in the Huzur tehsil and the Phanda block.

The village is the site of an ecotourism operations supported by Government of Madhya Pradesh. It is popular with Bhopal-based corporate staff for team-building exercises.

Demographics 

According to the 2011 census of India, Samarda has 86 households. The effective literacy rate (i.e. the literacy rate of population excluding children aged 6 and below) is 78.81%.

References 

Villages in Huzur tehsil